The 1872 West Cumberland by-election was fought on 26 March 1872.  The byelection was fought due to the Succession to a peerage of the incumbent MP of the Conservative Party, Henry Lowther.  It was won by the Conservative candidate The Lord Muncaster, who was unopposed.

References

West Cumberland by-election
West Cumberland by-election
West Cumberland by-election
19th century in Cumberland
By-elections to the Parliament of the United Kingdom in Cumbria constituencies
Unopposed by-elections to the Parliament of the United Kingdom in English constituencies